Acesur is a referent company within the olive oil sector in Spain, with 100% Spanish capital share and at the top five in the international framework. Its activity revolves around production, refining, bottling, marketing and exportation of olive oil and vegetable oil as well as olives, vinegars, sauces, mayonnaises and condiments. It owns many renowned brands such as La Espaṅola, Coosur and Al Amir. Acesur has also been awarded with many important prizes such as the Aster award to the company's labor or to the best company.

History 

Acesur was founded in 1840 and nowadays, more than 600 employees are distributed among its main facilities in Dos Hermanas, La Roda de Andalucia (Sevilla), Tarancón (Cuenca), Madrid, Mora de Toledo (Toledo), Vilches, Puente del Obispo and Jabalquinto (Jaén). It exports to more than 80 countries worldwide. Exportation entails more than 35% of the company's turnover. Despite the more than 20 brands Acesur offers to fit in each and every market, the star ones are “La Española” and “Coosur”. Acesur also created its own division of renewable energies, ENERSUR, with three main branches: Biomass, Electric Cogeneration and biodiesel. In 2010, the president of the company endowed Acesur with the Juan Ramón Guillen Foundation as part of the company's strategies in terms of social responsibility. This foundation focuses on the promotion and boosting of the rural environment and particularly, of the olive fields. The foundation's main aim is to declare the olive field as a heritage of humanity.

Chronological information 
 1840: Foundation. Beginning of management and contacts.
 1841: Registration Protocol of the company “Luca de Tena” in Torreblanca, Seville.
 1891: The company “Hijos de Luca de Tena” is defined in Huerta de la Salud, Seville.
 1892: The company is registered as Limited Partnership, putting up a brands and machinery.
 1947: The previous company is sold and “Aceites y Jabones Luca de Tena” is created instead.
 1948: Creation of “Luca de Tena, S.A.”.
 1952: The whole group is constituted as a Public Limited Company.
 1953: The Statutes are adapted in accordance to the new Legal System applicable to Public Corporations.
 1968: Creation of “Aceites Giralda, S.A.”
 1974: “Aceites y Jabones Luca de Tena, S.A.” sells the company name “Aceites Giralda, S.A.” in a complete reorganization that ended up with the removal to the group's current location at La Palmera Industrial. Some of the company's brands are sold and some others are grouped to establish a common policy within the international market. Determination of the generic name “Olivarera Internacional, S.A.” (OLIVASA)
 1976: The Guillen family, renowned olive oil experts, takes part in the company.
 1988: The whole group is named “ACEITES DEL SUR, S.A.” to highlight the origin of the Andalusian oils and to improve investments and other marketing aspects.
 1990: “Aceites del Sur, S.A.” celebrates 150-year anniversary, becoming one of the most important Andalusian family Company within the olive oil sector.
 2000: A factory and refinery in Aleppo, Syria is built to control and leader the bottled olive oil sales in the country and also to export to other Middle East countries such as Saudi Arabia, Kuwait, Iran or Yemen.
 2002: The company purchased Coosur, sited in Vilches, Jaén, and Olcesa, located in Tarancón, Cuenca. Important investments are also made in Jabalquinto, Jaén. Due to the constant increase of the company's facilities, the commercial name ACESUR is assigned to refer to the whole group.
 2008: Purchase of the olive waste plant in Jabalquinto. (Jaen).
 2009: Opening of Cogeneration Plant in Jabalquinto.
 2010: Acesur buys Duendesol and thus, the company enters the sauce market.
 2010: The Start of Juan Ramon Guillen Foundation's career, that was established to defend and enhance the olive and the rural sector.
 2011: Start of Biodiesel Plant functioning in Tarancon.

Exportations 
 1975: First exportations to United States. Subsequently, the company becomes one of the main olive oil suppliers in that country, with various distributors that place its olive oils all around the area.
 1989: La Española brand is positioned in Brazil with important distributors such as Paez Mendoça in Salvador de Bahia or Sendas in Rio de Janeiro, as well as other local distributors in São Paulo, Curitiba and Florianópolis.
 1995-1996: The company keeps growing in the Brazilian market and starts negotiations with Cargill.
 2004: Exportations to China with 10% imports in that Country, mainly with La Española and Coosur brands.
 2011: Acesur exports to more than 80 countries in the 5 continents.

Facilities 
Acesur spreads its facilities at different places within the national and international geography.
 Dos Hermanas (Seville): head office as well as Department Directives’ offices. Also production of those products set aside for exportation.
 Hacienda Guzman (La Rinconada, Seville): Juan Ramon Guillen Foundation Head Office.
 La Roda de Andalucía (Seville): olive milling, oil storage and table oil production. This facility also has a treatment of olive waste center.
 Puente del Obispo (Jaen): Treatment of olive waste center.
 Jabalquinto (Jaen): Treatment of olive waste center.
 Vilches (Jaen): Refining, bottling and storage of the company's products. This facility is equipped with an automatic logistics center.
 Tarancon (Cuenca): Production of sunflower oil. Also provided with a biodiesel plant.
 Madrid: Marketing and commercial offices.
 Aleppo (Syria): Olive oil production plant to supply the Middle East market.

Awards 
Here below are some of the most important prizes awarded to Acesur:
 Aster Price 2011 to its Professional Trajectory, given by the Graduate School of Marketing and Commercial Management
 “Foods from Spain” prize in 2010 to the Alimentary Industry.
 Doñana prize in 2008 to the best Sustainable Company.
 Family – Company award in 2007, given by San Telmo International Institute.
 “Golden” award in 2005 to La Española Extra Virgin Olive Oil, in the category of fats, butters and margarines. This prize is given by the German Magazine Lebbensmittel Praxis, which is leader in the distribution sector.
 Prince Felipe Business Excellence award 2002 in the International category, given by the Ministry of Industry, Tourism and Trade.
 TOP prize in 2002 to La Española Extra Virgin Olive Oil, conferred by the specialist of Spanish Magazine “Distribución Actualidad”.

References

External links
 Acesur
 Fundación
 Emoc
 Coosur

Food and drink companies of Spain
Companies of Andalusia
Olive oil
Spanish brands